Becalmed may refer to:

En rade or Becalmed, an 1887 novel by Joris-Karl Huysmans
"Becalmed", a song from the Brian Eno album Another Green World